Lenni Montiel is the United Nations Assistant Secretary-General for Economic Development in the Department of Economic and Social Affairs.  Prior to this appointment of 18 November 2014, Mr. Montiel was an Assistant Secretary-General of Social, Economic and Development Affairs.

Biographical Information
Mr. Montiel has a wide range of experience and expertise with the United Nations in the area of Development. He worked with the United Nations Development Programme as a Resident Coordinator in Turkmenistan and as a Senior Technical Adviser in Vietnam and Ukraine. Mr. Montiel studied at the University of Birmingham where he obtained a PhD in Public Policy, and at the Belarusian Institute for National Economy where he obtained an MSc in Economics.

References

Venezuelan officials of the United Nations
Living people
Year of birth missing (living people)
Belarus State Economic University alumni
Alumni of the University of Birmingham